A referendum on the 30 March Program was held in the United Arab Republic (now Egypt) on 2 May 1968. It was approved by 100% of voters, with only 798 votes against. Voter turnout was 98.2%.

Results

References

1968 in Egypt
1968 referendums
Referendums in the United Arab Republic
May 1968 events in Africa